Vicente Yap Sotto (born Vicente Sotto y Yap; April 18, 1877 – May 28, 1950) was a Filipino playwright, journalist, and politician who served as a Senator from 1946 to 1950. He also served in the House of Representatives from 1922 to 1925, representing Cebu's 2nd district. He was the main author of the Press Freedom Law (now known as the Sotto Law, Republic Act No. 53).

Personal life

Sotto was born in Cebu City on April 18, 1877, to Marcelino Sotto and Pascuala Yap. He is the younger brother of Filemon Sotto. He finished his secondary education at the University of San Carlos (formerly Colegio de San Carlos), Cebu City. He obtained the degree of Bachelor of Laws in Letran and Judicial Science and studied law in Manila Law College and passed the bar examinations in 1907.  Sotto was a member of the Philippine Independent Church (also known as the Aglipayan Church) as he saw independence from the Roman Catholic Church as a source of national pride.

Political career

In 1902, Senator Sotto entered politics when he ran for the municipal council of Cebu and won. In 1907, he was elected mayor despite his absence during the election owing to his involvement in a court battle caused by a kidnapping suit lodge against him by his opponent, and was forced to stay in Hong Kong. Sotto returned to the country in 1914.

In 1922, he was elected representative of the second district of Cebu until 1925. In 1937, he ran for governor of Cebu but lost. In May 1946, he ran for senator and won and served as Chairman of the Senate Committee on Finance until 1950. He served in the Senate until 1950.

Death
When he died on May 28, 1950, at the age of 73, his colleagues in the Senate remembered him as "recalcitrant, principled Sotto."

Contributions

To government and Philippine independence
Sotto was the main author of the Press Freedom Law (now known as the Sotto Law, Republic Act No. 53) enacted in 1946. The Sotto Law protects journalists from being compelled to name their news sources.

In 1899 (then just 22 years old), he put up La Justicia, the first newspaper in Cebu published by a Philippine citizen, in which he defended the issue of Philippine independence. It was suspended on orders by the American military governor.

In the week following, the undaunted Sotto begun publishing El Nacional. This was also ordered closed and Sotto was imprisoned at Fort San Pedro for two months and six days. After this experience, he began using the pen name Taga Kotta (of the fort, or resident of the fort).

He was found guilty of treason as a member of a committee of rebels along with those in Manila and Hong Kong. When he was freed in 1900, he published Ang Suga (The Light), which was first issued on June 16, 1901.

He organized in Hong Kong in 1911 the English-Spanish fortnightly The Philippine Republic. Its publication was stopped a year later and its editor was arrested. Sotto's extradition was requested three times by the American government but every time it was denied by the British courts. The Philippine Republic resumed publication after a month of suspension.

In 1915, Sotto returned to Manila and begun work on a weekly journal he named The Independent. He issued a special edition of this journal in Paris in 1929. The news item prompted an American senator to introduce a resolution in the United States Senate to grant immediate independence to the Philippines.

To Cebuano culture
Sotto is regarded as the Father of Cebuano language and letters. He is also considered the father of Cebuano journalism.

Sotto published Ang Suga, the first newspaper in Cebuano in 1900.

Sotto's play Paghigugma sa Yutang Natawhan (Love of Native Land), dramatized the Cebuano people's heroic struggle against Spanish feudal rule in the modern realist mode. He also wrote the first published Cebuano short story Maming in the maiden issue of Ang Suga.

He wrote, directed, and produced the first Cebuano play Elena, a play in three acts. It was first performed at the Teatro Junquera on May 18, 1902. The play established Sotto's reputation as a playwright.

The dedication of the play by the playwright reads, "To My Motherland, that you may have remembrance of the glorious Revolution that redeemed you from enslavement. I dedicate this humble play to you."

Tributes to Sotto
Carlos P. Garcia, 8th President of the Philippines, a native of Bohol and fellow Visayan, said of Sotto: "Vicente Sotto was a rock of Gibraltar in character because of the ruggedness of his conviction, the indomitability of his soul, the sublimity of his courage, and the depth of his faith in the ultimate triumph of justice. His knees no bending, his pen signed no retraction, his march saw no retreat, and his soul of steel knowns no surrender. He marshaled his efforts and used his influence to secure and safeguard for the press the fullest measure of freedom. By his death the country has lost a great patriot, his family has lost a loving and devote father, the Senate has lost an illustrious member..."

Southern Islands Hospital, the primary public medical care facility in southern Philippines, was renamed on May 21, 1992, to Vicente Sotto Memorial Medical Center, in honor of the late senator. A street inside the Cultural Center of the Philippines Complex in Pasay is named in his honor.

The University of San Carlos has established the Don Vicente Sotto Cebuano Studies grant as a contribution to the formation of a scholarly awareness of the various aspects of history, social life, language, and the arts of Cebu.

See also
 List of Philippine legislators who died in office

References and notes

External links
 Profile from senate.gov.ph
 Full text of Case vs. Vicente Sotto, for Contempt of Court
 Senator Vicente Yap Sotto, The Great Dissenter 
 Republic Act No. 53: Sotto Law  Retrieved 09-20-21.
 Amendment to RA No. 53.  Retrieved 09-20-21.

1877 births
1950 deaths
Cebuano people
Senators of the 2nd Congress of the Philippines
Senators of the 1st Congress of the Philippines
Members of the House of Representatives of the Philippines from Cebu
Visayan people
Mayors of Cebu City
University of San Carlos alumni
Vicente
Members of the Philippine Legislature
Members of the Philippine Independent Church